Álvaro Enrique Peña Montero (born 8 March 1989) is an Uruguayan footballer.

Personal life
Peña was born in Montevideo. He is twin brother of Uruguayan footballer Agustín Peña and the son of the former Uruguayan international footballer José Enrique Peña.

External links
 

Living people
1989 births
Uruguayan footballers
Uruguayan expatriate footballers
Club Nacional de Football players
Cerro Largo F.C. players
Atenas de San Carlos players
Puntarenas F.C. players
C.A. Bella Vista players
Montedio Yamagata players
Deportivo Capiatá players
Boston River players
Rampla Juniors players
Uruguayan Primera División players
J2 League players
Expatriate footballers in Costa Rica
Expatriate footballers in Japan
Expatriate footballers in Paraguay
Association football midfielders